USCC may refer to:
 USCC Racing Association, an American snowmobile racing group
 Chelyabinsk Airport, in Russia
 United SportsCar Championship, a North American sports car racing series
 United States Catholic Conference, now part of the United States Conference of Catholic Bishops, the episcopal conference of the Catholic Church in the United States
 United States Cellular Corporation, the fourth-largest wireless telecommunications network in the United States
 United States Chamber of Commerce, an American lobby group
 United States Christian Commission, an American religious group supporting the Union Army during the American Civil War
 United States Cochrane Center, part of the Cochrane Collaboration
 United States Corps of Cadets, the student body of the United States Military Academy
 United States-China Economic and Security Review Commission

See also 
 5th United States Colored Cavalry, a regiment of the United States Army during the American Civil War